The Binghamton Black Bears are a minor professional hockey team in the Federal Prospects Hockey League (FPHL) based in Binghamton, New York, with home games at Visions Veterans Memorial Arena.

History
A new Federal Prospects Hockey League (FPHL) team owned by Andreas Johansson, the majority owner of the Watertown Wolves, was approved to play at Visions Veterans Memorial Arena in Binghamton, New York, on May 12, 2021. The team began play in the 2021–22 season, replacing the Binghamton Devils of the American Hockey League that had relocated to Utica, New York. Former ECHL player James Henry was initially named the team's first head coach, but he left in August 2021 to join the ECHL's Reading Royals as an assistant coach. Former Danville Dashers and Indianapolis Ice head coach Rod Davidson was then hired to replace Henry.

Season-by-season results

Notes

References

External links
 Binghamton Black Bears website

Federal Prospects Hockey League teams
Ice hockey teams in New York (state)
Ice hockey clubs established in 2021
Sports in Binghamton, New York
2021 establishments in New York (state)